Cryptandra wilsonii is a flowering plant in the family Rhamnaceae and is endemic to the south-west of Western Australia. It is a shrub with hairy young stems, oblong to narrowly oblong leaves and clusters of white, tube-shaped flowers arranged in small clusters.

Description
The upper surface of the leaves is glabrous, the lower surface is usually concealed and the tip of the leaf curves downwards.

Taxonomy and naming
Cryptandra wilsonii was first formally described in 1995 by Barbara Lynette Rye in the journal Nuytsia from specimens collected near Cape Riche Beach in 1974. The specific epithet (wilsonii ) honours the Australian botanist, Paul G. Wilson.

Distribution and habitat
This cryptandra usually grows in sandy soil, sometimes in mallee scrub, and occurs from north-east of Wialki to Cape Riche and near Gibson in the Avon Wheatbelt, Coolgardie, Esperance Plains, Jarrah Forest and Mallee bioregions of Western Australia.

Conservation status
Cryptandra wilsonii is listed as "not threatened" by the Government of Western Australia Department of Biodiversity, Conservation and Attractions.

References

wilsonii
Rosales of Australia
Flora of Western Australia
Plants described in 1995
Taxa named by Barbara Lynette Rye